Forreston is a village in Ogle County, Illinois, United States. The population was 1,446 at the 2010 census, down from 1,469 in 2000.

History
Forreston was platted in 1854, and named for the forests near the original town site.

Brought on by the town's predominant population of German-ancestry, the annual "Sauerkraut Days" was a popular free-food festival held in the city limits of Forreston.
Sauerkraut Days has recently been started up again, taking place in August with food and a car show.

Geography

Forreston is located at  (42.125700, -89.579955).

It is 100 miles west of Chicago.

Demographics

As of the census of 2000, there were 1,469 people, 594 households, and 414 families residing in the village. The racial makeup of the village was 99.25% White, 0.14% Native American, 0.20% Asian, 0.07% from other races, and 0.34% from two or more races. Hispanic or Latino of any race were 1.23% of the population.

There were 594 households, out of which 35.4% had children under the age of 18 living with them, 58.2% were married couples living together, 8.4% had a female householder with no husband present, and 30.3% were non-families. 26.4% of all households were made up of individuals, and 16.2% had someone living alone who was 65 years of age or older. The average household size was 2.47 and the average family size was 3.01.

In the village, the population was spread out, with 28.3% under the age of 18, 6.5% from 18 to 24, 28.5% from 25 to 44, 19.4% from 45 to 64, and 17.3% who were 65 years of age or older. The median age was 37 years. For every 100 females, there were 90.8 males. For every 100 females age 18 and over, there were 86.7 males.

The median income for a household in the village was $36,554, and the median income for a family was $44,853. Males had a median income of $35,463 versus $21,086 for females. The per capita income for the village was $16,958. About 7.4% of families and 9.6% of the population were below the poverty line, including 13.8% of those under age 18 and 9.2% of those age 65 or over.

Education
Forreston has its own school district, Forrestville Valley School District 221. The district operates Forreston Elementary, Middle, and High schools, as well as German Valley preschool and kindergarten.

Gallery

Notes

External links

 Forreston City Town Info
Weather Channel

Villages in Ogle County, Illinois
Villages in Illinois
Populated places established in 1854
1854 establishments in Illinois